The Max Planck Institute for the History of Science (German: Max-Planck-Institut für Wissenschaftsgeschichte) is a scientific research institute founded in March 1994. It is dedicated to addressing fundamental questions of the history of knowledge from the Neolithic era to the present day, and its researchers pursue a historical epistemology in their study of how new categories of thought, proof, and experience have emerged in interactions between the sciences and their ambient cultures.

Organization 
The MPIWG comprises three departments and several independent research groups. The departments are:
 "Structural Changes in Systems of Knowledge," directed by Jürgen Renn
 "Knowledge Systems and Collective Life," directed by Etienne Benson
 "Artifacts, Action, Knowledge," directed by Dagmar Schäfer
Hans-Jörg Rheinberger, who headed Department III from 1995 to 2014, and Lorraine Daston, who headed Department II from 1995 to 2019, remain at the MPIWG as emerita.

The Research Groups are:

 "Practices of Validation in the Biomedical Sciences," led by Lara Keuck
 "China in the Global System of Science," led by Anna L. Ahlers
 "Historical Epistemology of the Final Theory Program," led by Alexander Blum
 "Experience in the Premodern Sciences of Soul & Body ca. 800–1650," led by Katja Krause

In addition are groups and programs focusing on:

 Research IT and Digital Humanities 
 Computational History of Science

The institute also comprises doctoral students, and research and teaching cooperations with other institutions worldwide.

Journalists in Residence 
The institute has a Journalist-in-Residence program.

References

External links
 

Organisations based in Berlin
History of Science
History institutes
History of science organizations
History organisations based in Germany